"If You're Ready (Come Go with Me)" is a song by the Staple Singers.  Released from their album Be What You Are, the single spent three weeks at number one on the Billboard magazine's Hot Soul Singles chart in 1973.  It peaked at number nine on the Billboard Hot 100 pop singles chart.  It became a gold record.

The arrangement, tempo, cadence, and melody reflect more constant uptempo than the group's 1972 number 1 hit "I'll Take You There".

Chart history

Other versions
 In 1985, British Jamaican singer Ruby Turner covered  this song featuring South African singer-songwriter and guitarist Jonathan Butler.  Her version reached #30 in the UK, #29 in Ireland and number three in New Zealand.

 In 1987, American Contemporary Christian singer Steve Archer covered this song for his fourth solo album Off the Page.

References

External links
 Lyrics at OldieLyrics

1973 singles
The Staple Singers songs
Songs written by Homer Banks
Songs written by Raymond Jackson (songwriter)
Stax Records singles
1973 songs
Songs written by Carl Hampton